Gyeyang District (Gyeyang-gu) is a ward in Incheon, South Korea.

History

The first historical record of Gyeyang-gu goes back to the Goguryeo kingdom in 470 AD under the name of Jubuto-gun. It was renamed to Bupyeong-dohobu in 1413 AD. It was later renamed Gyeyang-myeon and it was renamed again Buk-Gu (North Ward), Incheon as it was annexed to Incheon in 1989. Bupyeong-gu, Gyeyang-gu, and Seo-gu were all formed out of this ward. Seo-gu was separated out in 1988, and both Gyeyang-gu, and Bupyeong-gu were formed in 1995.

Location

Gyeyang-gu borders Bupyeong-gu to the south, Seo-gu to the west, Seoul's Gangseo-gu and Bucheon city to the east, and Gimpo city's Gochon-myeon to the north.

Points of interest

Bupyeongdohobu Government Building - Originally built during the reign of King Sejong (1413-1487 AD), it was destroyed during the Japanese invasion of 1592 and again during the Qing invasion of 1636. It was last rebuilt during the reign of King Sukjong (1674–1720 AD)

Gyeyang Mountain (395m, part of the Hannam-jeongmaek mountain range) is located in the northern part of the ward, and is mainland Incheon's highest point (Mani Mountain, located on Ganghwa Island is 469m tall.) Many hiking trails lead around and to the peak of the mountain.

Tomb of Youngshingun Yi I- Yi I (1424-1526 AD), whose royal name was Youngshingun, was the sixth son of UI Song Gun Chae, who was a son of Prince Hyo-ryeong, who was the second son of King Tae Jong. He was conferred his royal title after giving distinguished service to the royal family and the nation.

Administrative Divisions of Gyeyang-gu

Hyoseong 1 and 2 Dong
Gyesan 1 to 4 Dong
Jakjeon 1 and 2 Dong
Jakjeon-Seoun Dong (combination of Jakjeon-dong and Seoun-dong)
Gyeyang 1-dong (divided in turn into Bakchon-dong, Dongyang-dong, Gyulhyeon-dong, Sangya-dong. Haya-dong, Pyeongdong, Nooji-dong, Seonjuji-dong, Ihwa-dong, Oryu-dong, Galhyeon-dong, Duksil-dong, Moksang-dong, Danam-dong and Janggi-dong)
Gyeyang 2-dong (divided in turn into Imhak-dong, Yeongjong-dong, Byeongbang-dong and Bangchuk-dong)

Transportation
Gyeyang-gu is served by Incheon Subway Line 1. It also served by AREX.

Education

Gyeongin National University of Education has a campus in Gyeyang-gu.

Bugincheon Middle School in Gyesan-1 Dong opened in 1999. It has three buildings. During the period 2008 to 2010, it enrolled 1288 students, equally divided between boys and girls. English language is one area of instruction.

References

External links
Gyeyang-gu homepage 

 
Districts of Incheon